Markus Hodel (born 4 May 1961) is a Swiss retired footballer who played in the 1980s. He played as defender.

Hodel played for two years from 1983 to 1985 for FC Concordia Basel in the 1st League, the third tier of Swiss football. In the summer of 1985 he moved on to play for local rivals FC Nordstern Basel in the same division, before he moved on again one year later.

Hodel joined FC Basel's first team for their 1986–87 season under head-coach Helmut Benthaus. After playing in four test games, Hodel played his domestic league debut for his new club in the home game in the St. Jakob Stadium on 3 September 1986 as Basel won 5–3 against Zürich.

At the end of the following 1987–88 Nationalliga A season, under manager Urs Siegenthaler, Hodel and his team suffered relegation, but he stayed on with the club. Hodel scored his first goal for them on 3 September 1988 in the Swiss Cup, in the home game as Basel won 4–1 against Young Boys.

Hodel stayed with the club for four seasons. Between the years 1986 and 1990 Hodel played a total of 130 games for Basel scoring a total of two goals. 84 of these games were in the Nationalliga A, nine in the Swiss Cup and 37 were friendly games. He didn't score a goal in the domestic league, but one in the cup and the other was scored during the test games.

References

Sources
 Die ersten 125 Jahre. Publisher: Josef Zindel im Friedrich Reinhardt Verlag, Basel. 
 Verein "Basler Fussballarchiv" Homepage

FC Concordia Basel players
FC Nordstern Basel players
FC Basel players
Swiss men's footballers
Association football defenders
1961 births
Living people
Swiss Super League players
Swiss Challenge League players